Quaint Honour is a 1958 play by Roger Gellert whose subject is homosexuality in a school for young men.

Further reading 

 
 
 

LGBT-related plays
Pederastic literature
1958 plays